Austrocallerya is a genus of flowering plants belonging to the subfamily Faboideae in the family Fabaceae. They are robust, twining woody vines.

Its native range is from New Guinea to eastern Australia and islands in the Southern Pacific.

Description

The mature stems have flaky, peeling bark. The leaves are evergreen and generally have 4–18 paired leaflets plus a terminal leaflet. They are dark reddish, purple or maroon in two of the species and white with purple tips in A. megasperma. Nine of the stamens are fused together, the other is free; all curve upwards at the apex.

Taxonomy

In 1912, Stephen Troyte Dunn recognized the distinctiveness of three Australasian species then placed in the genus Millettia, and created a separate section, Austromillettia, for them. A 2019 molecular phylogenetic study found that the three species did not belong either in the genus Millettia or in the genus Callerya where they had later been placed, but instead formed a distinct clade, sister to Padbruggea, within a newly expanded tribe Wisterieae. Accordingly, the genus Austrocallerya was established. The genus name refers to the southern hemisphere distribution of the species and their former placement in Callerya.

Austrocallerya species can be distinguished from Padbruggea by a number of features, including the more upright inflorescences, the broader standard petals, and the more linear seed pods.

Species
, Plants of the World Online accepted three species:
Austrocallerya australis 
Austrocallerya megasperma 
Austrocallerya pilipes

Distribution
Austrocallerya species are native to New Guinea, Queensland and New South Wales in eastern Australia, and various islands in the Southern Pacific (the Cook Islands, New Caledonia, Norfolk Island, the Solomon Islands, the Tuamotus and Tubuai).

References

Wisterieae
Fabaceae genera